South[-]west[ern] British may refer to:

 South West England, one of the nine official regions of England (which is, in part, the most southwesterly of the constituent countries of modern Great Britain)
 South West England (European Parliament constituency)
 Southwest Britain, a vague generic term for various historical regions including the West Country, Wessex, and Dumnonia (in order of most to least recent)
 Southwestern Brittonic languages